The booted macaque (Macaca ochreata) is a macaque of the Sulawesi Island, Indonesia. This Old World monkey is diurnal and spends most of the day in the trees. It is 50–59 cm long plus a tail of 35–40 cm.

The booted macaque feeds on figs, buds, invertebrates and cereals.

Two subspecies are recognized:
 M. o. ochreata
 Muna-Buton macaque, M. o. brunnescens

Outside their native Indonesia booted macaques are found only at the Catoctin Wildlife Preserve and Zoo in Thurmont, Maryland.  A family of booted macaques has resided there since the 1960s, and they are already into their fourth generation in captivity.

References

External links
Photos at ARKive.

 Catoctin Wildlife Preserve and Zoo

booted macaque
Primates of Indonesia
Mammals of Sulawesi
booted macaque
Taxa named by William Ogilby